Armando de Miranda (1904–1975) was a Portuguese film director, screenwriter, editor and producer. He directed twenty six films, including a number of documentaries. He directed the 1945 historical adventure film José do Telhado and its 1949 sequel The Return of José do Telhado.

Selected filmography
 José do Telhado (1945)
 Black Capes (1947)
 The Return of José do Telhado (1949)

References

Bibliography
 Vieira, Patricia. Portuguese Film, 1930-1960,: The Staging of the New State Regime. A&C Black, 2013.

External links

1904 births
1975 deaths
Portuguese film directors
Portuguese film producers
Portuguese screenwriters
Male screenwriters
Portuguese male writers
Portuguese film editors
20th-century screenwriters